Harmi

is a village development committee in Gorkha District in the Gandaki Province of northern-central Nepal. At the time of the 1991 Nepal census it had a population of 3,910 and had 754 houses in the town.

References

Populated places in Gorkha District